Salvius may refer to:

People

Given name and mononym
 Salvius Tryphon (2nd century BC), leader of the Second Servile Revolt
 men of the Salvia gens
 Marcus Salvius Otho, an emperor of Rome
 Gāius Salvius Līberālis (history), Roman aristocrat stationed in Britain, and the subject of the Cambridge Latin Course Book II
 Salvius of Carthage, martyr (3rd century)
 Salvius of Albi, saint and bishop of Albi in Gaul (6th century)
 Salvius of Amiens, saint and bishop of Amiens in Gaul (7th century)
 Salvius of Angoulême (8th century), saint and bishop of Angoulême
 Johan Adler Salvius (1590–1652), Swedish diplomat of the 17th century

Surname
Johan Adler Salvius (1590–1662) Swedish diplomat
 Laurence Salvius (a.k.a. Laurentii Salvii, 18th century), of Stockholm, publisher of Carl Linnaeus

Other
Salvius (robot) the open source humanoid robot